BNS Sahayak (Bengali - "helper") is a Fleet Replenishment Ship of the Bangladesh Navy, currently assigned to support anti-piracy operations.

Career
The Sahayak  is currently moored at Chittagong, serving with the Commodore Commanding BN Flotilla (COMBAN). About 50 personnel serve aboard Sahayak.

See also
 List of active ships of the Bangladesh Navy

Auxiliary ships of the Bangladesh Navy